Prince of Fortuna was a royal title created for Luis de la Cerda in November, 1344, by Pope Pope Clement VI. Fortuna is the ancient name for the Canary Islands.

Royal titles